"Universe" is the fifth overall single taken from Australian pop duo Savage Garden's self titled debut album. The version of B-side "This Side of Me" that appears on the single release is roughly twenty seconds shorter than other released versions. This is the version that was originally intended for release.

Background
"Universe" was released as a single on 20 October 1997, exclusively in Australia, as at the time, "To the Moon and Back" had only just been released in Europe, the United Kingdom and the United States. 

It was the last official single to be released from the album in Australia, and was the most added song to radio stations on the week of release. The song also charted at number 25 on the New Zealand Singles Chart. It also peaked at number 26 in the group's home country.

Music video
The music video depicts the duo in an oriental themed setting, with various women and couples dancing together, and taking photos of the women on Polaroids. In some shots, Darren is seen at a long table with them, simply singing to the camera, and also performing the song on a stage. The video did not see a commercial release until it was released on the DVD component of The Singles compilation, released in June 2015.

Track listing
 "Universe" – 4:21
 "Love Can Move You" – 4:47
 "This Side of Me" (short version) – 3:51
 "Universe" (Future of Earthly Delites Mix) – 4:38

Charts

References

1997 singles
Savage Garden songs
Songs written by Daniel Jones (musician)
Songs written by Darren Hayes
1996 songs
Contemporary R&B ballads
1990s ballads
Pop ballads